Yekaterina Nikolaevna Golubeva (9 October 1966 – August 2011), usually credited as Katerina Golubeva or Katia Golubeva, was a Russian actress who moved to Paris and became known for her films with such directors as Šarūnas Bartas, Claire Denis, and Leos Carax.

Biography
Golubeva was born in Leningrad. After studying at the Gerasimov Institute of Cinematography she began her acting career in Russian films.

She moved to Paris, France and lived and worked there. She married Lithuanian film director Šarūnas Bartas and starred in a series of films made under his direction. She also was a co-writer of the screenplay for his film The House (1997).  

She also starred in films by Claire Denis and in her partner Leos Carax's Pola X (1999). 

Golubeva died in Paris in August 2011; no official cause of death was given. She was buried at Père Lachaise Cemetery. 

She was survived by three children. Her daughter Ina Marija Bartaitė became an actress. She was killed at the age of 25 in a traffic accident in April 2021 while bicycling, after being hit by a drunk driver.

Partial filmography

Actress
 Grazhdane vselennoy (1984)
 Nauchis tantsevat (1985) – Larisa
 Skazka pro vlyublyonnogo malyara (1987)
 Skazka o gromkom barabane (1987)
 Three Days (1991)
 Mest shuta (1993)
 I Can't Sleep (1994) – Daiga
 Solina (1994, short) – Solina
 The Corridor (1995)
 Pribytiye poyezda (1995, segment Exercise No.5)
 Sur place (1996)
 Few of Us (1996)
 Sans titre (1997, short)
 Un affare trasversale (1998)
 Pola X (1999) – Isabelle
 L'Âme-soeur (1999, short)
 Twentynine Palms (2003) – Katia
 The Intruder (2004) – La jeune femme russe
 977 (2006) – Tamara
 Il dit qu'il est mort (2008, short) – La femme
 The Funeral Party (2008)
 American Widow (2009) – Traveling woman
 Kotorogo ne bylo (2010)
 Dom s bashenkoy (2012) – Boy's ill mother

Screenwriter
 The House (1997, co-writer, dir. Šarūnas Bartas)

Notes

References

External links
 
 
 
 

1966 births
2011 deaths
Russian emigrants to France
Russian actresses
Burials at Père Lachaise Cemetery